Romane Jacqueline Elisabeth Goormachtigh (born 28 February 1970 in Dordrecht, South Holland) is a retired discus thrower from the Netherlands, who represented her native country at the 1996 Summer Olympics in Atlanta, United States. There she did not reach the final, after having thrown 58.74 metres in the qualifying heats. She was named Rotterdam Sportswoman of the Year in 1993.

Achievements

References
  Dutch Olympic Committee

1970 births
Living people
Dutch female discus throwers
Olympic athletes of the Netherlands
Athletes (track and field) at the 1996 Summer Olympics
World Athletics Championships athletes for the Netherlands
Dutch sportspeople of Surinamese descent
Sportspeople from Dordrecht
Athletes from Rotterdam
20th-century Dutch women
21st-century Dutch women